Srobarova may refer to:

Šrobárová, a village in Komarno District, Slovakia
Gymnázium Šrobárova, a high school in Košice, Slovakia